Crawl is a 2011 Australian suspense-thriller written and directed by Paul China and produced by Benjamin China. The film stars George Shevtsov, Georgina Haig and Paul Holmes.

Plot 
Slim Walding (Paul Holmes), a bar owner, hires a Croatian (George Shevtsov) to kill an acquaintance over an unpaid debt. The crime is carried out, but the culprit leaves behind the murder weapon, an antique pistol belonging to Slim (thus framing him for the homicide). As the Croatian makes his getaway, he accidentally runs down a stranded motorist. The murderer seeks refuge at a nearby, isolated house, where he holds a young woman, Marilyn Burns (Georgina Haig), hostage.

The Croatian learns that Marilyn's fiancé is the motorist he has killed. To escape on a motorcycle (the only vehicle at hand), he returns to the crash site to retrieve the man's keys. There, the Croatian murders the fiancé, after discovering he is still alive. Later, Slim realizes that his prized pistol has been stolen and that he has been set up. Learning the Croatian's whereabouts, he heads off looking for revenge. At the house, however, after freeing bound-and-gagged Marilyn, Slim is killed when the Croatian unexpectedly attacks him with an axe. Marilyn then kills the Croatian.

Cast 
George Shevtsov as The Stranger
Georgina Haig as Marilyn Burns
Paul Holmes as Slim Walding
Lauren Dillon as Holly
Lynda Stoner as Eileen
Catherine Miller as Annie
Andy Barclay as Travis
Bob Newman as Rusty Sapp
Paul Bryant as Sergeant Byrd
John Rees-Osbourne as Constable Rolly

Production 
The film was shot on location in Queensland, Australia in late 2010.

Soundtrack 
Australian composer Christopher Gordon scored the film.

Release 
Crawl played at over thirty international film festivals, including Sitges Film Festival in Spain, FrightFest in the UK, and Brisbane International Film Festival in Australia. Bloody Disgusting released the film in the US on 1 September 2012, and Arrow Films released the film theatrically in the UK on 22 February 2013.

Reception 
Sean Decker of Dread Central said the film ″rivals No Country For Old Men in gritty style and suspense″ and was an ″assured Hitchcockian slow-burn.″  Journalist Alan Jones awarded the film four stars saying ″not since the Coen Brothers' Blood Simple has there been a more exciting thriller debut...a nail-bitingly effective study in slow-burning terror...scary, sly and sexy...a twisted and skillful homage to film noir.″

Accolades

References

External links 

Crawl at Rotten Tomatoes

2011 films
Australian thriller films
2011 directorial debut films
2010s English-language films